Goalball at the 2014 Asian Para Games was held at the Seonhak International Ice Rink in Incheon, South Korea from 19 to 23 October 2014. There were two gold medals in this sport.

Medal summary

Medal table

Medalists

Men's tournament

Preliminaries

Group A

Group B

Knockout round

Semifinals

Bronze-medal match

Gold-medal match

Goalscorers

Final standings

Women's tournament

Preliminaries

Goalscorers

Final standings

References

External links
Goalscorers Men's Team
Goalscorers Women's Team
Competition Summary Men's Team
Competition Summary Women's Team
Medallists by Event
Medal Standings
Goalball results

2014 Asian Para Games events